Torn Again is an album by American singer-songwriter Peter Case, released in 1995.

Critical reception

Music critic Denise Sullivan of Allmusic called the album a return to form, calling it "More heartfelt and less hardened, Case sings for the grown-ups."

Track listing
All songs by Peter Case unless otherwise noted.
"Turnin' Blue" – 4:28
"Baltimore" – 4:30
"Workin' for the Enemy" – 4:20
"Breaking the Chain" (Case, Fontaine Brown) – 3:25
"Anything" (Case, Mark Hart) – 4:15
"Blind Luck" (Case, Fred Koller) – 4:16
"Little Wind (Could Blow Me Away)" (Case, Tom Russell) – 3:56
"Punch & Socko" – 2:43
"Wilderness" – 4:48
"Takin' It" – 3:50
"Airplane" – 4:22
"Moves Me Deeply" (Case, Billy Swan) – 3:03

Personnel
Peter Case – vocals, guitar, harmonica
Don Heffington – drums
Larry Hirsch – percussion
Greg Leisz – dobro, mandolin, guitar, steel guitar
Jerry Scheff – bass
Steven Soles – drums, guitar, percussion, background vocals
Billy Swan – background vocals

References

Peter Case albums
1995 albums
Vanguard Records albums